NA Hussein Dey, an Algerian professional association football club, has gained entry to Confederation of African Football (CAF) competitions on several occasions. They have represented Algeria in the Confederation Cup on two occasions and the now-defunct Cup Winners' Cup on three occasions.

History
NA Hussein Dey whose team has regularly taken part in Confederation of African Football (CAF) competitions. Qualification for Algerian clubs is determined by a team's performance in its domestic league and cup competitions, NA Hussein Dey have achieved African qualification via the Algerian Cup and have played in the former African Cup Winners' Cup. the first match was against Al Madina and ended in victory for NA Hussein Dey 2–1 As for the biggest win result was in 1980 against ACS Ksar 7–0, and biggest defeat in 1978 against Horoya AC club 3–1, first participation in International competition were in the African Cup Winners' Cup in 1978 Where did they reach the final and were defeated against Horoya AC as the second Algerian club to reach the final of a continental competition. Where was the club featuring the best stars of the Algeria national football team like Ali Fergani, Mahmoud Guendouz, Chaabane Merzekane and Rabah Madjer.

Then, in 1980, in the same competition NA Hussein Dey reached the semi-finals and eliminated against Africa Sports 2–3 aggregate, After that NA Hussein Dey spent 14 years to participate in a continental competition the last in the twentieth century, as the team waited 12 years to participate in the CAF Confederation Cup for the first time. In the 2018–19 CAF Confederation Cup, the start was against Diables Noirs, to qualify and face Green Eagles ended 2–1 aggregate. in the last match before the group stage, they faced Al-Ahly Benghazi and ended with a 2–3 victory. and the draw put them in Group D with Zamalek, Gor Mahia from Kenya and Petro de Luanda. To finish third with 8 points and get eliminated.

CAF competitions

Non-CAF competitions

Statistics

By season
Information correct as of 17 March 2019.
Key

Pld = Played
W = Games won
D = Games drawn
L = Games lost
F = Goals for
A = Goals against
Grp = Group stage

PR = Preliminary round
R1 = First round
R2 = Second round
PO = Play-off round
R16 = Round of 16
QF = Quarter-final
SF = Semi-final

Key to colours and symbols:

Overall record

In Africa
:

Non-CAF competitions
:

Finals
Matches won after regular time (90 minutes of play), extra-time (aet) or a penalty shootout (p) are highlighted in green, while losses are highlighted in red.

Statistics by country
Statistics correct as of game against Zamalek on March 17, 2019

CAF competitions

Non-CAF competitions

African competitions goals
Statistics correct as of game against Zamalek on March 17, 2019

Hat-tricks

Two goals one match

Non-CAF competitions goals

African and arab opponents by cities

References

Africa
Algerian football clubs in international competitions